Jérôme Bortoluzzi (born 20 March 1982 in Amnéville) is a French athlete specialising in the hammer throw. He competed for France at the 2012 Summer Olympics.

His personal best in the event is 78.26 metres from 2012.

Competition record

References

1982 births
Living people
People from Amnéville
French male hammer throwers
Athletes (track and field) at the 2012 Summer Olympics
Olympic athletes of France
Sportspeople from Moselle (department)
Mediterranean Games silver medalists for France
Mediterranean Games medalists in athletics
Athletes (track and field) at the 2009 Mediterranean Games
Athletes (track and field) at the 2013 Mediterranean Games